The 1969–70 Kentucky Wildcats men's basketball team represented University of Kentucky. The head coach was Adolph Rupp. The team was a member of the Southeast Conference and played their home games at Memorial Coliseum.

Roster

NCAA tournament
Mideast
 Kentucky 109, Notre Dame 99
Jacksonville 106, Kentucky 100

Team players drafted into the NBA

References

Kentucky
Kentucky Wildcats men's basketball seasons
Kentucky Wildcats
Kentucky Wildcats
Kentucky